Henrik Poulsen may refer to:

Henrik Poulsen, author of the book 77: The Year of Punk and New Wave
Henrik Poulsen, CEO of Ørsted